Robin Baggett Stadium is a baseball venue located on the campus of California Polytechnic State University in San Luis Obispo, California, United States.  It is home to the Cal Poly Mustangs baseball team, a member of the Division I Big West Conference. The stadium is named for Robin Baggett, a former baseball player at Cal Poly.

History  
The stadium opened on January 21, 2001, with the Mustangs defeating #1 ranked Stanford 6–5 in 12 innings. The stadium originally had a capacity of 1,734 before the expansion and is part of a  facility which is also home to the Mustangs softball team. Previously, before the permeant expansion, the stadium was expandable with additional temporary bleachers to a capacity of 3,042 as was the case for the 2014 NCAA Baseball Regional hosted by Cal Poly. The record attendance for a 3-game series is 8,585 vs Cal State Fullerton May 6–8, 2005.

In 2012, college baseball writer Eric Sorenson ranked the field as the fifth best setting in Division I baseball. In 2013, the Mustangs ranked 51st among Division I baseball programs in attendance, averaging 1,290 per home game.

In 2014, the Mustangs ranked 40th among Division I baseball programs in attendance, averaging 1,505 per home game. In 2014 Cal Poly hosted its first ever Division I Baseball Tournament Regional.  The regional featured Cal Poly as the #1 seed along with Arizona State, Pepperdine and Sacramento State. In a matter of minutes after going on sale, Cal Poly quickly sold out its first game of the regional against Sacramento State.  Actual Attendance peaked Saturday night at 2,941 with Cal Poly's 2nd game despite all 3,042 tickets being sold out.

In 2018 the university began a $8 million enhancement project at Baggett Stadium.  The project included a two-story, 10,000-square-foot clubhouse complete with a lounge and kitchen, meeting and study space, locker room, training room, offices, and a therapeutic cold plunge pool. In addition, new permeant seating and backstop safety netting was installed by the start of the 2018 season, raising the capacity to 3,138.

Announced February 13, 2019, a new Daktronics videoboard ranging 36 feet to 20.4 feet was added, with 1,080-by-612 pixel resolution LED lighting. As part of an almost overall $10 million project, an $8 million Dignity Health Baseball Clubhouse was completed in August 2020. The two-story, 10,000-square-foot clubhouse includes a lounge and kitchen, meeting and study space, locker room, offices and a therapeutic cold-plunge pool. The previously existing clubhouse, which had stood for 17 years, was demolished on June 11, 2018 by the project's contractor, Exbon Development of Garden Grove, California. Permanent bleachers providing increased seating capacity to 3,138 fans were added along with new backstop safety netting before the 2018 season. Before the clubhouse project, a 6,000-square-foot lighted hitting area was completed for roughly $300,000 in November 2012, with retractable netting allowing for three long cages alongside three short cages. The $1 million Hoffman Press Box, which provides seating for 20 event staff employees and media, was completed in April 2021 and includes two tiered rows of seats, electrical and internet upgrades and improved sight lines.

See also
 List of NCAA Division I baseball venues

References

Cal Poly Mustangs baseball
College baseball venues in the United States
Baseball venues in California
2001 establishments in California
Sports venues completed in 2001
Buildings and structures in San Luis Obispo, California